Corporate child care is a specific form of child care sponsored or managed by an employer. It may be a perk or a part of the corporate social responsibility policy of the company.  It can provide the working parents with an opportunity to find work–life balance. The corporations sponsor child care as it may increase employee loyalty, lower workforce absenteeism, decrease maternity leaves and improve on-job concentration.

Scope 

Companies have started corporate child care schemes for the young Generation Y employees, many of whom aspire to establish a work–life balance while pursuing a career and gaining money. Many working parents face challenges such as lack of free places in public pre-schools, inappropriate schedule, expensive services of private child care and preschools, low quality of services or little time spending with a child. The corporate child care programs intend to address these issues. Such a program may cover the following:

 The company provides new child care places for children
 Timetable is adjusted to parents working hours
 The company can cover all the expenses or share them with parents
 Better quality (due to recruitment system, ongoing education, teachers’ development)
 More time to spend with children (during the transfer time)

Realization model

Each program provides children with appropriate development environment and education model designed by high-qualified teachers

 Nido environment from 0 up to 1 year old
 Corporate child center for children 0–3 years old
 Corporate kindergarten/center for children 3–6 years old
 Back-up care for children 0–3 и 3–6 years old
 Corporate children camp for children of different ages (from 3 up to 14) for holidays

Possible benefits 

 Increased loyalty of all employees
 Qualification maintenance of employees during the maternity leave
 Reduced employee absenteeism
 Decreased healthcare costs
 Increased employee productivity
 Strengthened image of caring and responsible employer
 Developed family-oriented corporate culture
 Cost saved on recruiting and training new employees

References 

Child care
Employee benefits